.eg is the Latin alphabet country code top-level domain (ccTLD) for Egypt. Any entity who wants to register a domain name ending with .eg must have a local representative or the domain name has to be hosted on Egyptian DNS servers. Egypt's Arabic alphabet ccTLD is .مصر‎.

Second-level domains
There are eleven second-level domains.  Registrations are possible at the second level (directly under .eg) or at the third level beneath these names.
 .ac.eg: Academic sites.
 .com.eg: Commercial sites.
 .edu.eg: Educational sites.
 .eun.eg: Egyptian Universities Network.
 .gov.eg: Governmental sites.
 .info.eg: Information sector.
 .mil.eg: Military sites.
 .name.eg: Personal "name" websites.
 .net.eg: Networking.
 .org.eg: Egyptian organizations.
 .sci.eg: Scientific sites.
 .sport.eg: Sports sites.
 .tv.eg: Visual media.

References

External links
IANA .eg whois information

Country code top-level domains
Mass media in Egypt
Internet in Egypt